The Initiative Neue Soziale Marktwirtschaft (INSM) – New Social Free Market Initiative – is a neoliberal German think tank and advocacy organization with headquarters in Berlin that was founded in 2000 by the employers' organization Gesamtmetall. Through professional communication, the INSM tries to create a favorable climate for free-market economic reforms, and entrepreneurship, emphasizing individual responsibility and competitiveness.

Well-known economic and political experts closely associated with the INSM and serving as "INSM ambassadors" include Roland Berger, Arend Oetker, Hans Tietmeyer, Wolfgang Clement, Paul Kirchhof, Oswald Metzger, Silvana Koch-Mehrin, and others. The "brand" INSM was created by Scholz & Friends from which the INSM still receives strategic input.

Media partnerships
INSM has partnered with  print media like Wirtschaftswoche, Frankfurter Allgemeine Sonntagszeitung, Die Welt and   Handelsblatt but also influences the guest choice for political talkshows; it tries to reach political audience is reached via influence on TV-series scripts, and to reach  young people  via content in MTV.

Campaigns
In July 2019, INSM launched a campaign with the aim of redefining how climate change should be tackled. It was built on 12 so-called facts, arguing essentially that Germany is already doing its share, and that limiting temperature rise to 2 degrees Celsius will be sufficient. These have been analysed by Volker Quaschning, focussing on the orientation of the statement toward preservation of German national industry. 

Ahead of the 2021 national elections, INSM launched a campaign in which it portrayed the Green Party's chancellor candidate Annalena Baerbock dressed as a biblical Moses, holding two tablets under the caption "Annalena and the 10 prohibitions." In its campaign, the group attacked the Greens' policies to steer Germans into electric cars and onto trains instead of domestic flights. Its portrayal of Baerbock as Moses met criticism and accusations of anti-Semitism.

See also
 Bertelsmann Stiftung
 Mont Pelerin Society

References

External links
 INSM – Initiative Neue Soziale Marktwirtschaft Home page

Political and economic think tanks based in Germany
Libertarian think tanks
2000 establishments in Germany